Judaa 3 Chapter 1 is a 2021 studio album by Amrinder Gill. The album was produced by Dr Zeus, whereas lyrics were penned by Raj Ranjodh, Jaggi Jagowal, Harmanjeet, Bir Singh, Umar Malik, and Navi Ferozpuria. The album is sequel to a 2014 album Judaa 2 by Gill and Zeus. The album was released on digital media on 1 September 2021. The album debuted at number 61 on Canadian Albums Chart by Billboard.

Track listing

Reception 
Three songs from the album debuted on UK Asian chart by Official Charts Company. "Chal Jindiye" debuted at no. 20, "Band Darwaze" at no. 26, and "Pagg" at no. 36. As of November 4, 2022, the music video of "Chal Jindiye" has been viewed over 50 million times on YouTube, and the video for "Band Darwaze" has been viewed over 10 million times.

Charts

References 

Amrinder Gill albums
2021 albums